This is a summary of the electoral history of Harry Holland, Leader of the Opposition, (1926–28; 1931–33) Leader of the Labour Party (1919–33) and Member of parliament for Grey (1918–19) and Buller (1919–33).

Parliamentary elections

New South Wales

1901 election

1907 election

Australia

1901 election

1910 election

New Zealand

1914 election

1918 Wellington North by-election

1918 Grey by-election

1919 election

1922 election

1925 election

1928 election

1931 election

Leadership elections

1919 leadership election

1920 leadership election

1921 leadership election

1922 leadership election

1923 leadership election

Notes

References

Holland, Harry